The Canon Ōita Factory in Ōita, Japan, is Canon's main digital imaging product plant and manufactures products such as the PowerShot, IXUS compacts, DSLR cameras, and camcorders. The plant manufactured up to 6.8 million products in 2005.

Since 1999, the factory has moved away from assembly line production to cell based production with teams of up to 20 workers. Each cell can assemble 500 camcorders in an eight-hour shift.

Canon invested 27.6 billion yen to expand the factory in two stages between 2004 and 2005.

References

Canon Insiders, Gadjets, Life, Toronto Sun

Buildings and structures in Ōita Prefecture
Manufacturing plants in Japan
Canon Inc.
1982 establishments in Japan
Buildings and structures completed in 1982